Rhythm on the River is a 1940 musical comedy film directed by Victor Schertzinger and starring Bing Crosby and Mary Martin as ghostwriters whose songs are credited to a composer played by Basil Rathbone.  Crosby and Martin sang "Only Forever", for which James V. Monaco (music) and Johnny Burke (lyrics) were nominated for the Academy Award for Best Original Song.

Plot
Oliver Courtney is an arrogant composer who lets other people write songs he takes credit for. Bob Sommers writes his tunes with Billy Starbuck. At the night of a social Christmas party, Oliver introduces Bob's song "What Would Shakespeare Have Said?" as his own. Later that night, Oliver thanks Bob for his loyalty and offers him a contract for $50 a week for three years. He refuses, saying he would rather have a catboat to visit his uncle at his river hotel, called Nobody's Inn.

After his lyric writer dies, Oliver finds a replacement in Cherry Lane. She is reluctant about being a ghost writer, but accepts his offer. He is satisfied with her first lyric. She becomes ambitious to write better lines, but is not able to concentrate at home, and it is suggested she move to a small and quiet place. Meanwhile, Bob and Cherry meet several times, without knowing they are working for the same employer. She does not think highly of him.

To work in a perfect environment, Cherry travels to Tarrytown and stays at Nobody's Inn. Bob decides to give the inn a visit at the same time, and they are shocked to run into each other yet again. They soon become acquainted and actually start liking each other. They even compose their own song together. However, because they are not allowed to tell who they are working for, they do not find out they are colleagues. She becomes mad at him when he plays the song; she wrote the lines for and states he wrote it himself.

Bob is confused and travels back to town to resign. Cherry has come to office as well to inform her boss she thinks someone has stolen his lines. They realize they were working together all along. Bob and Cherry make up and decide to start their own music composing careers. After a few unsuccessful auditions, Bob agrees to start a band. They audition for Mr. Westlake, but he is only interested in Cherry. He offers her a job as a nightclub singer, but she is loyal to the band and rejects his offer.

Bob notices it is a great opportunity for Cherry and gives her his consent to work for Westlake. He takes his job back as Oliver's ghost writer and raises $200 so Cherry can premiere with the song they wrote together at Nobody's Inn. However, she is unhappy at her new job and is helped by Bob to get out of her contract. Oliver feels sympathetic toward them and persuades them not to walk away by announcing the song is not written by him. After announcing they will soon marry, Bob and Cherry perform their song.

Cast

Bing Crosby as Bob Sommers
Mary Martin as Cherry Lane
Basil Rathbone as Oliver Courtney
Oscar Levant as Billy Starbuck
Oscar Shaw as Charlie Goodrich
Charley Grapewin as Uncle Caleb
Lillian Cornell as Millie Starling
William Frawley as Mr. Westlake
John Scott Trotter as himself (orchestra leader)

Ken Carpenter as Teddy Gardner (announcer)
Phyllis Kennedy as Patsy Flick
Brandon Hurst as Bates
Jeanne Cagney as Country cousin
Billy Benedict as Elevator boy
Charles Lane as Bernard Schwartz
Pierre Watkin as "Uncle" (pawnshop owner)
Helen Bertram as Aunt Delia

Various musicians and entertainers also make appearances, including Wingy Manone, Jack Pepper, and Harry Barris

Reception
Bosley Crowther of The New York Times enjoyed it. "It’s a very funny thing about this picture business—or this musical picture business, we should say. One producer may come along with a supercolossal whopper, all dressed up in fancy pants and boasting a high-class score and folks will find themselves sitting watch on a dull and pretentious fizzle. And then along will come Paramount, say, with an entry such as “Rhythm on the River.” which opened at the Paramount yesterday—an after-you sort of entry which gives the odd impression of having been casually shot “off the cuff”—and, behold, it turns out to be one of the most like-able musical pictures of the season... What’s there to it? Well, there’s Bing, whose frank and guileless indifference, whose apparent dexterity with ad libs is, in this case, beautiful to behold. There is Miss Martin, who is ever so comfortable to look at and who sells a very nice song. There is also Oscar Levant, slumming from “Information, Please,” who makes up in bashless impudence what he lacks in looks, charm, poise and ability to act. There are Mr. Rathbone, Charley Grapewin and Wingy Manone, who plays a hot trumpet, and there are several tuneful numbers, especially “Rhythm on the River” and “Ain’t It a Shame about Mame.” Add them all up and they total a progressively ingratiating picture—one that just slowly creeps up and sort of makes itself at home. It’s a funny business, all right."

This was echoed by Variety. "Some may tab this as the best picture Crosby has appeared in for several years. It’s certainly one of his toppers . . . Bing Crosby continues his policy of splitting co-starring credits and performance importance with others in the cast. . .Crosby tackles his acting assignment with the nonchalance that has proven effective in past releases and on the air. He also provides much of the musical portion of the film in singing tunes in solo and with Miss Martin...Total of seven songs are presented by Crosby and Miss Martin, any one of which has potentialities for swinging into the hit class. Although ‘Only Forever’ gets strong plugging in the picture, there’s a good chance that the title tune, ‘Rhythm on the River,’ sung by Crosby will catch strongest pop favor..."

Soundtrack
 "Only Forever" sung by Bing Crosby and Mary Martin.
 "When the Moon Comes Over Madison Square" (James V. Monaco / Johnny Burke) sung by Bing Crosby.
 "Rhythm on the River" (James V. Monaco / Johnny Burke) sung by Bing Crosby.
 "That's for Me" (James V. Monaco / Johnny Burke) sung by Bing Crosby and Mary Martin.
 "What Would Shakespeare Have Said?" (James V. Monaco / Johnny Burke) sung by Bing Crosby and by Lillian Cornell.
 "Ain't It a Shame About Mame?" (James V. Monaco / Johnny Burke) sung by Mary Martin.
 "I Don't Want to Cry Any More" (Victor Schertzinger) sung by Mary Martin.
 "Tiger Rag" featured by Wingy Manone and his Band.

Bing Crosby recorded a number of the songs for Decca Records. “Only Forever” topped the Billboard charts for nine weeks and "That's for Me" charted also with a peak position of #9 in a 7-week stay. Crosby's songs were also included in the Bing's Hollywood series.

Connection to The Carpenters
The film mentions a (fictional) song named "Goodbye to Love"; Richard Carpenter watched the film and thought that would be a good title for a Carpenters song, which was eventually recorded and released in 1972.

References

External links
 
 
 

1940 films
1940 musical comedy films
American musical comedy films
American black-and-white films
Films directed by Victor Schertzinger
Paramount Pictures films
Films about composers
1940s American films